Lukas Pägelow (born March 5, 1994) is a German professional footballer who plays as a central defender for LSK Hansa.

Club career
He made his debut for Hansa Rostock in August 2013, as a substitute for Sebastian Pelzer in a 3–1 win over VfB Stuttgart II in the 3. Liga.

External links

1994 births
Living people
German footballers
FC Hansa Rostock players
3. Liga players
Association football central defenders
Lüneburger SK Hansa players
People from Hagenow
Footballers from Mecklenburg-Western Pomerania